The 23rd edition of the Kuwait Federation Cup tournament saw all 15 Kuwaiti clubs participating in 2 groups.

Group stage

Group 1

Group 2

Kuwait Federation Cup